GLGE is a programming library for use with WebGL and JavaScript.

GLGE is a JavaScript library intended to ease the use of WebGL, a native browser JavaScript API giving direct access to OpenGL ES 2, allowing for the use of hardware accelerated 2D and 3D applications without having to download any plugins.

The aim of GLGE is to mask the involved nature of WebGL from the web developer, who can then spend their time creating richer content for the web.

Main features 

 Keyframe animation
 Per-pixel lighting directional lights, spot lights and point lights
 Normal mapping
 Animated materials
 Skeletal animation
 COLLADA format support
 Parallax mapping
 Text rendering
 Fog
 Depth Shadows
 Shader-based picking
 Environment mapping
 Reflections/Refractions
 Collada Animations
 Portals
 LOD
 Culling
 2D filters

External links
 Official Site
 Source Code

Computer libraries